Israel has competed at the Olympic Games as a nation since 1952.  Its National Olympic Committee was formed in 1933, during the British Mandate of Palestine.  
Israel has sent a team to each Summer Olympic Games since 1952 (except when they participated in the American-led boycott of the 1980 Summer Olympics), and to each Winter Olympic Games since 1994. The country became a member of the European Olympic Committees (EOC) in 1994.

Medal tables

Medals by Summer Games

Medals by Winter Games 

 Bold — Highest in column.

Medals by summer sport

List of medalists

History 

In 1933 the Palestine National Olympic Committee was officially formed, and was recognized by the International Olympic Committee in May 1934, despite never competing (the 1936 games were held in Nazi Germany and were boycotted by this Jewish Olympic committee, while the 1940 and 1944 games were cancelled due to WWII). Although the Palestine National committee represented Muslims, Jews, and Christians living in British-ruled Mandatory Palestine, its rules stated that they "represent[ed] the Jewish National Home." In 1948, shortly after the State of Israel was established, its request to participate in the 1948 Olympics was denied, as Mandatory Palestine had ceased to exist and the newly formed State of Israel wasn't yet recognized by IOC.

Israel was previously part of the Asian Games Federation until it was disbanded in 1981. In 1982 instead of joining the new Olympic Council of Asia, Israel opted to join the European Olympic Committees.

Competing
Israel won its first Olympic medal in its tenth Olympic appearance, in 1992, in Judo when Yael Arad won a silver medal. She was followed a day later by another judoka, Oren Smadja, who won bronze. 
Since then, Israel won a bronze medal in five successive Summer Olympics until the streak ended in 2012. Additionally, in 2004, Gal Fridman became Israel's first gold medallist, in men's windsurfing. This was his second medal, following his bronze in 1996, and he is the only individual multi-medallist. Israel also won 2 bronze medals in 2016. 
In the postponed 2020 Games Israel received 2 gold medals, won by Artem Dolgopyat in men's gymnastics (floor routine), and Linoy Ashram in women's rhythmic gymnastics (individual all-around), and 2 bronze medals, one won by Avishag Semberg in taekwondo, and 1 won by the judo Mixed team. As a member of the Israel national judo Mixed team, Ori Sasson became Israel's second multi-medalist, while the latter bronze one is a shared one. 
Through 2018, Israel has not won any medals in the Winter Olympics.

Ágnes Keleti, who emigrated to Israel in 1957, holds more medals than any other Israeli citizen. During the 1952 and 1956 Summer Olympics Ágnes won 10 medals competing for Hungary at the Olympics. The only Jew to hold more medals than Keleti is American swimmer Mark Spitz, who won 11.

Israel has been more successful at the Paralympic Games than at the Olympics, with 375 medals between 1960 and 2016.

Conflicts with nations

1972 Summer Olympics

Eleven members of the Israeli Olympic team were murdered by Palestinian terrorists during the Munich massacre. The tragedy caused the Israeli delegation to withdraw from the remainder of the Games.

The murdered people were:

David Berger, 28, weightlifter
Ze'ev Friedman, 28, weightlifter
Yossef Gutfreund, 40, wrestling referee
Eliezer Halfin, 24, wrestler
Yossef Romano, 32, weightlifter
Amitzur Shapira, 40, track coach
Kehat Shorr, 53, shooting coach
Mark Slavin, 18, wrestler
Andre Spitzer, 27, fencing coach
Yakov Springer, 51, weightlifting judge
Moshe Weinberg, 33, wrestling coach

On 3 August 2016, two days prior to the start of the 2016 Summer Olympics, the International Olympic Committee officially honored the Israelis killed for the first time.   They were also honored during the Opening Ceremonies of the 2020 Summer Olympics.

1980 Summer Olympics
Israel was one of the countries that boycotted the Moscow Olympics in protest at the Soviet invasion of Afghanistan, but also because of Soviet opposition to Israel and Zionism.

2004 Summer Olympics
An Iranian judoka, Arash Miresmaeili, did not compete in a match against Israeli Ehud Vaks during the 2004 Summer Olympics, due to the government of Iran having taken steps to avoid any competition between its athletes and those from Israel. He was officially disqualified for being overweight, however Miresmaeli was awarded US$125,000 in prize money by the Iranian government, an amount paid to all Iranian gold medal winners. The International Judo Federation conducted an investigation to see if he intentionally came in overweight in order to miss the bout. He was officially cleared of intentionally avoiding the bout, but his receipt of the prize money raised suspicion.

2016 Summer Olympics

Saudi Arabian judoka, Joud Fahmy, forfeited her match in the 2016 Summer Olympics possibly in order to avoid competing against Israeli Gili Cohen. Later in the 2016 Summer Olympics, Israeli Or Sasson defeated Egyptian judoka Islam El Shahaby in the first round, after the match ended, Sasson tried to shake his opponent's hand, but El Shahaby refused.

Prior to the 2016 opening ceremony, the Lebanese delegation was assigned to ride on the same bus as the Israeli delegation. The head of the Lebanese team, Salim al-Haj Nicolas, admitted that he demanded that the bus door be closed on the Israeli team, and that the Lebanese demanded that the Israeli athletes not board the bus. Udi Gal, an Israeli Olympic sailor, said his team ultimately decided to travel separately to avoid an "international and physical incident" but added "How could they let this happen on the eve of the Olympic Games? Isn't this the opposite of what the Olympics represents?"

Olympic participants

Summer Olympics

Winter Olympics

See also
 Israel at the Paralympics
 List of flag bearers for Israel at the Olympics
 Sport in Israel
 Jewish Olympics
 Antisemitism in the Olympic Games
 Boycotts of Israel in sports

References

External links